The South Africa national under-23 football team is a youth football team, which represents South Africa and is controlled by the South African Football Association, the governing body for football in South Africa. The team's main objectives are to qualify and play at the All-Africa Games and Olympic Games. The team has played at three All-Africa Games and one Olympic tournament.
Players who are selected, will be 23 or younger in the following Olympic year. With the next Olympics being held in London in 2012, players need to have been born on or after 1 January 1989. At the Olympic finals tournament, the team may be supplemented with 3 over-age players.

History
The team was started in 1994, when SAFA decided to form a youth team. The team has been sponsored by SASOL since its inception, leading to the nickname, 'Amaglug-glug'. The team's greatest achievements to date include a third-place finish at the 1999 All-Africa Games, hosted in South Africa and qualifying for the 2000 Olympics in Sydney, Australia.

Results and fixtures

Legend

2019

2021

Coaching staff

Manager history
 Jean-Michel d'Avray (1993–1997)
 Ephraim Mashaba (1998–2002)
 Kenneth Kubheka (2002–2004)
 Styles Phumo (2004)
 Steve Komphela (2005)
 Pitso Mosimane /  Serame Letsoaka (2005)
 Steve Komphela (2005–2007)
 David Notoane (2019–2021)
 Helman Mkhalele (2021–2022)
 David Notoane (2022-present)

Players

Current squad
 The following players were called up for the 2023 Africa U-23 Cup of Nations qualification matches.
 Match dates: 23 and 30 October 2022
 Opposition: 

Notable players
Players who have previously played for the under-23 team, and have since gone on to play for the senior team:

Emile Baron
Brian Baloyi
Matthew Booth
Delron Buckley
Rowen Fernández
Stanton Fredericks
Quinton Fortune
David Kannemeyer
Steve Lekoelea
Jabu Mahlangu
Benni McCarthy
Fabian McCarthy
Aaron Mokoena
Toni Nhleko
Siyabonga Nomvete
Andile Jali
Thulani Serero
Eric Mathoho
Patrick Mbuthu
Nkiphiteni Matombo
Thiyekile Gulwa
Mzunani Mgwigwi

 Overage players in Olympic Games 

Competitive record
Olympic Games

Prior to the 1992 Olympic Games campaign, the Olympic football tournament was open to full senior national teams.

Africa U-23 Cup of Nations

African Games*Draws include knockout matches decided by penalty shootout.''

References

External links
South Africa FA official website

African national under-23 association football teams
Soccer